Jraifia is a small town and rural commune in the Boujdour Province of the Laâyoune-Sakia El Hamra region of the Moroccan-controlled part of Western Sahara. At the time of the 2014 census, the commune had a total population of 950 people. The commune contains the RAMSAR site Côte Aftissate-Boujdour.

References

Populated places in Laâyoune-Sakia El Hamra
Boujdour Province